Margaret Anna Dobson (November 9, 1888 – January 20, 1981) was an American painter, etcher, illustrator, and muralist born in Baltimore, Maryland.

Education
She studied at the Maryland Institute, the Pennsylvania Academy of the Fine Arts,  Palace School of Art in Paris and Syracuse University. At various times she studied with  Cecilia Beaux, Emil Carlsen, Daniel Garber, Violet Oakley, and Robert Vonnoh.

Career
While studying in Paris she painted frescos at the Fontainebleau Palace and the Hospital of St. Vincent de Paul, also in Fontainebleau.
During the Great Depression Bessemer painted  a post office mural in Kaufman, Texas, entitled Driving the Steers, which was later "covered over"  or "destroyed".

References

1888 births
1981 deaths
American muralists
American women illustrators
American illustrators
American etchers
Maryland Institute College of Art alumni
Pennsylvania Academy of the Fine Arts alumni
Syracuse University alumni
Section of Painting and Sculpture artists
American women painters
American women printmakers
20th-century American painters
Artists from Baltimore
Painters from Maryland
20th-century American women artists
Women muralists
20th-century American printmakers
Women etchers